John Pierson (March 17, 1937 – November 18, 2018) was an American journalist.
  
His work while at The Wall Street Journal earned him a place on the master list of Nixon political opponents. Pierson's articles detailed White House efforts to manipulate press coverage of Nixon.

References

Pierson, John (December 28, 1971). An Ultraconservative Campaigns to Return Nixon to 'Right' Path. Wall Street Journal
Pierson, John (February 4, 1972). From the Left and Right, McCloskey, Ashbrook Tug, Futilely, at Nixon. Wall Street Journal

American male journalists
1937 births
2018 deaths